La Rive Condominiums is a 312-ft (95 m) tall skyscraper in Minneapolis, Minnesota. It was completed in 1987 and has 29 floors. It is the tallest building in the Nicollet Island/East Bank neighborhood of the University Community, and the 31st-tallest building in the city.

See also
List of tallest buildings in Minneapolis

References
Emporis

Residential skyscrapers in Minneapolis
Residential buildings completed in 1987